Parepimelitta barriai is a species of beetle in the family Cerambycidae. It was described by Cerda in 1968.

References

Necydalopsini
Beetles described in 1968